Alfred Theodor Brauer (April 9, 1894 – December 23, 1985) was a German-American mathematician who did work in number theory. He was born in Charlottenburg, and studied at the University of Berlin. As he served Germany in World War I, even being injured in the war, he was able to keep his position longer than many other Jewish academics who had been forced out after Hitler's rise to power. In 1935 he lost his position and in 1938 he tried to leave Germany, but was not able to until the following year. He initially worked in the Northeast, but in 1942 he settled into a position at the University of North Carolina at Chapel Hill. A good deal of his works, and the Alfred T. Brauer library, would be linked to this university. He occasionally taught at Wake Forest University after he retired from Chapel Hill at 70. He died in North Carolina, aged 91.

He was the brother of the mathematician Richard Brauer, who was the founder of modular representation theory.

See also
Brauer chain
Scholz–Brauer conjecture

References

Further reading

External links

20th-century German mathematicians
20th-century American mathematicians
Number theorists
Academic staff of the Humboldt University of Berlin
University of North Carolina at Chapel Hill faculty
Wake Forest University faculty
Jewish American scientists
Scientists from Berlin
1894 births
1985 deaths
Jewish emigrants from Nazi Germany to the United States
German Jewish military personnel of World War I
People from Charlottenburg
People from the Province of Brandenburg
20th-century American Jews